The United States-Israel Advanced Research Partnership Act of 2016 (H.R. 5877) was a bill introduced in the United States House by U.S. Representative John Ratcliffe (R-Texas). The Democratic cosponsor is Representative James Langevin (D-RI). The legislation, which was signed into law, allows the U.S. and Israel to cooperate on cybersecurity technologies research and development.

Background 
Cybersecurity industry experts believe that collaboration between countries is one of the best way to prevent cyber attacks. A critical need exists for countries to share research and development in the cybersecurity world.

The United States and Israel work together in a research and development program called the Homeland Security Advanced Research Projects Agency.

A 2014 law authorized the Department of Homeland Security to work with Israel on a pilot program to improve:
 Border security
 Maritime security
 Aviation security

Legislative details 
H.R. 5877 makes the program permanent by removing the “pilot” designation and adds cybersecurity as the fourth program area.

The law allows the Department of Homeland Security to work together with Israel on cybersecurity initiatives.

The law doesn't authorize any new expenditures. Because the Department of Homeland Security is already carrying out activities similar to this, the Congressional Budget Office estimated that the law would not affect spending. Additionally, H.R. 5877 does not contain any intergovernmental or private-sector mandates.

Legislative history 
The bill followed this path from introduction to being signed into law:
 7/14/16 - The bill was introduced in the House.
 11/15/16 - It was amended and reported favorably by the House Committee on Homeland Security.
 11/29/16 - The bill was passed by the full House of Representatives by voice vote.
 12/10/16 - The Senate passed the bill by unanimous consent.
 12/16/16 - President Barack Obama signed the bill into law, making it Public Law 114-304.

See also 
 Homeland Security Act of 2002
 Information security
 Israeli Ministry of Public Security
 Network security

References

External links 
 Homeland Security Advanced Research Projects Agency website
 Homeland Security Advanced Research Projects Agency fact sheet

Statutory law